The Roman Catholic Diocese of Port Blair is a diocese located in the city of Port Blair in the Ecclesiastical province of Ranchi in India.

History
 June 22, 1984: Established as Diocese of Port Blair from the Metropolitan Archdiocese of Ranchi

Leadership
 Bishops of Port Blair (Latin Rite)
 Bishop Aleixo das Neves Dias, S.F.X. (June 22, 1984 – January 6, 2019)
 Bishop Visuvasam Selvaraj (June 29, 2021 – present)

References

External links
 GCatholic.org 
 Catholic Hierarchy 

Roman
Roman Catholic dioceses in India
Christian organizations established in 1984
Roman Catholic dioceses and prelatures established in the 20th century
Christianity in the Andaman and Nicobar Islands
1984 establishments in the Andaman and Nicobar Islands